Corymbia ellipsoidea is a species of tree that is endemic to Queensland. It has rough bark on the trunk and larger branches, lance-shaped adult leaves, flower buds usually in groups of seven, creamy white flowers and barrel-shaped to urn-shaped fruit.

Description
It has red-brown over dull, white to cream or grey tessellated bark that is persistent on the trunk, reddish, scaly or flaky bark that is shed in small polygonal flakes on the larger branches, and smooth grey, pink or cream-coloured bark on the thinnest branches. Flowering has been observed in January and February and the flowers are white or cream-coloured.

Taxonomy and naming
This eucalypt was first formally described in 1987 by Denis Carr and Stella Carr and was given the name Eucalyptus ellipsoidea. In 1995 Ken Hill and Lawrie Johnson changed the name to Corymbia ellipsoidea.

Distribution and habitat
Corymbia ellipsoidea is locally abundant in scattered locations, growing in woodland on sandy soil on granite ridges from the Atherton Tableland, south west to the Newcastle Range near Forsayth and south to near Charters Towers

Conservation status
This eucalypt is classified as of "least concern" under the Queensland Government Nature Conservation Act 1992.

See also
 List of Corymbia species

References

ellipsoidea
Myrtales of Australia
Flora of Queensland
Plants described in 1987
Taxa named by Maisie Carr